Italian submarine Luigi Torelli was a  of the Italian navy during World War II. The vessel operated in the Atlantic from September 1940 until mid-1943, then was sent to the Far East. After Italy's surrender in 1943, the Luigi Torelli was taken over by Nazi Germany's Kriegsmarine, then, in the waning months of the war, the Japanese Imperial Navy. It was one of only two ships to serve in all three major Axis navies, the other being the Italian submarine Comandante Cappellini.

Construction
Luigi Torelli was built at the Oto shipyard in La Spezia, Italy. One of six boats of the Marconi-class submarine, which were laid down on 15 February 1939, Luigi Torelli was launched on 6 January 1940. Designed as an ocean-going vessel, she was intended for operations both in the Mediterranean and in the Atlantic.

Service history
When Italy entered World War II in June 1940 the Luigi Torelli was still completing its training and shakedown period. Afterward, it conducted a short reconnaissance mission in the Gulf of Genoa, and was then dispatched to the Atlantic to Bordeaux in occupied France to serve in the Italian submarine flotilla there.

Between 11 and 29 September 1940, the Luigi Torelli was assigned to patrol an area just off the Azores Islands. On 5 October 1940, she reached Bordeaux. In the following weeks, the boat left port several times and made short practice missions.

On 15 January 1941 Luigi Torelli, under the command of Primo Longobardo, sighted a small convoy and sank the Greek vessel Nemea, the Norwegian vessel Brask and the Greek vessel Nicolas Filinis. A fourth vessel was also damaged, but escaped due to the foul weather.
This was one of the few examples of an Italian submarine achieving great results while participating in a Wolfpack attack, according to Regia Marina Italiana.
Two weeks later, the Luigi Torelli sank the British vessel Urla. In July 1941, she sank the Norwegian tanker Ida Knudsen. A year later, she sank the British vessel Scottish Star and the Panamanian motor tanker Esso Copenhagen.

In 1943, the Luigi Torelli, after surviving at least two serious air attacks, was one of seven Italian submarines designated to be converted into transports. The Italian boats, due to their dimensions, were deemed better suited for long voyages to the Far East on missions to acquire precious and rare material. The Luigi Torelli left for the Far East on 14 June 1943. The operation was under German control but the Luigi Torelli retained its Italian crew.

The Luigi Torelli was one of three Italian submarines in the Far East in 1943 when the new Italian government agreed to an armistice with the Allies. Of the three, the Luigi Torelli, Comandante Cappellini and Giuliani and their crews were temporarily interned by the Japanese. The Luigi Torelli and two other boats then passed to German U-boat command and, with mixed German and Italian crews, continued to fight against the Allies. The Kriegsmarine assigned new officers to the Luigi Torelli, renamed her the UIT-25 and had her take part in German war operations in the Pacific.

Following the German surrender in 1945, the Luigi Torelli was again given a new name, the I-504, by the Japanese, and operated with the Imperial Japanese Navy until 30 August 1945. The Luigi Torelli and sister submarine Comandante Cappellini were the only two ships to fly the flags of all three main Axis powers during World War II.

As the I-504, Luigi Torelli's crew claimed to shoot down a B-25 Mitchell bomber while under the Japanese flag near the very end of the war in the Pacific, allegedly the last success by an Axis naval vessel in the conflict.

Fate
Captured by the U.S. in Kobe, Japan, at the conclusion of the war, the Luigi Torelli was scuttled by the US Navy in the Kii Strait on 16 April 1946.

Summary of raiding history

Notes

Notes

Citations

References
 Erminio Bagnasco, Submarines of World War Two, Cassell & Co, London. 1977 
 
 Vincent O'Hara, Enrico Cernuschi: Dark Navy: The Italian Regia Marina and the Armistice of 8 September 1943 (2009). 
 Roger Chesneau, Robert Gardiner: Conway's All the World's Fighting Ships 1922–1946 (1980).

External links
photo
 World War II Archives Foundation
 Regia Marina, Luigi Torelli
 Stories and Battle Histories of the IJN's Submarines, February 10, 2010, HIJMS Submarine I-504: Tabular Record of Movement
 Comando Supremo: Italy at War, Italian submarines and surface vessels in the far east: 1940–1945
 Luigi Torelli Marina Militare website

Marconi-class submarines
Ships built by OTO Melara
Ships built in La Spezia
1940 ships
World War II submarines of Italy
World War II submarines of Germany
World War II submarines of Japan
Naval ships of Italy captured by Germany during World War II
Foreign submarines of the Imperial Japanese Navy
Merchant submarines
World War II shipwrecks in the Pacific Ocean
Maritime incidents in June 1942
Maritime incidents in 1946
Scuttled vessels